Abler is a surname. Notable people with the surname include:

 Ronald F. Abler (born 1939), American geographer
 William Abler, American paleontologist

See also
 Aber (name)
 Abley
 Adler (surname)